The Dutch Empire or the Dutch colonial empire comprised the overseas territories and trading posts controlled and administered by Dutch chartered companies—mainly the Dutch East India Company and the Dutch West India Company—and subsequently by the Dutch Republic (1581–1795), and by the modern Kingdom of the Netherlands after 1815.
It was initially a trade-based system which derived most of its influence from merchant enterprise and from Dutch control of international maritime shipping routes through strategically placed outposts, rather than from expansive territorial ventures. The Dutch were among the earliest empire-builders of Europe, following Spain and Portugal and one of the wealthiest nations of that time.

With a few notable exceptions, the majority of the Dutch colonial empire's overseas holdings consisted of coastal forts, factories, and port settlements with varying degrees of incorporation of their hinterlands and surrounding regions. Dutch chartered companies often dictated that their possessions be kept as confined as possible in order to avoid unnecessary expense, and while some such as the Dutch Cape Colony and Dutch East Indies expanded anyway (due to the pressure of independent-minded Dutch colonists), others remained undeveloped, isolated trading centres dependent on an indigenous host-nation. This reflected the primary purpose of the Dutch colonial empire: commercial exchange as opposed to sovereignty over homogeneous landmasses.

The imperial ambitions of the Dutch were bolstered by the strength of their existing shipping industry, as well as the key role they played in the expansion of maritime trade between Europe and the Orient. Because small European trading-companies often lacked the capital or the manpower for large-scale operations, the States General chartered larger organisations—the Dutch West India Company and the Dutch East India Company—in the early seventeenth century. These were considered the largest and most extensive maritime trading companies at the time, and once held a virtual monopoly on strategic European shipping-routes westward through the Southern Hemisphere around South America through the Strait of Magellan, and eastward around Africa, past the Cape of Good Hope. The companies' domination of global commerce contributed greatly to a commercial revolution and a cultural flowering in the Netherlands of the 17th century, known as the Dutch Golden Age. In their search for new trade passages between Asia and Europe, Dutch navigators explored and charted distant regions such as Australia, New Zealand, Tasmania, and parts of the eastern coast of North America. During the period of proto-industrialization, the empire received 50% of textiles and 80% of silks import from the India's Mughal Empire, chiefly from its most developed region known as Bengal Subah.

In the 18th century, the Dutch colonial empire began to decline as a result of the Fourth Anglo-Dutch War of 1780–1784, in which the Dutch Republic lost a number of its colonial possessions and trade monopolies to the British Empire, along with the conquest of the Mughal Bengal at the Battle of Plassey by the British East India Company. Nevertheless, major portions of the empire survived until the advent of global decolonisation following World War II, namely the East Indies and Dutch Guiana. Three former colonial territories in the West Indies islands around the Caribbean Sea—Aruba, Curaçao, and Sint Maarten—remain as constituent countries represented within the Kingdom of the Netherlands.

Former Dutch colonial possessions 
This list does not include several former trading posts stationed by Dutch, such as Dejima in Japan.

 Dutch East Indies with company rule (1603–1949), and Dutch New Guinea (until 1962)
 Dutch India (1605–1825)
 Dutch Gold Coast (1612–1872)
 New Netherlands (1614–1667, 1673–1674)
 Dutch Guianas (1616–1975)
 Dutch Formosa (1624–1662), and Keelung (Fort Noord-Holland; 1663–1668)
 Dutch Virgin Islands (1625–1680)
 Dutch Bengal (1627–1825)
 Dutch Brazil (1630–1654)
 Dutch Mauritius (1638–1710)
 Dutch Ceylon (1640–1796)
 Dutch Malacca (1641–1795, 1818–1825)
 Dutch Cape Colony (1652–1806)
 Dutch Malabar (1665–1795)
 Dutch Surinam (1667–1954)
 New Holland (Acadia) (1674–1678)

History

Origins (1543–1602)

The territories that would later form the Dutch Republic began as a loose federation known as the Seventeen Provinces, which Charles V, Holy Roman Emperor and (as "Carlos I") King of Spain, inherited and brought under his direct rule in 1543. In 1566, the Protestant Dutch Revolt broke out against rule by Catholic Spain, sparking the Eighty Years' War. Led by William of Orange, independence was declared in the 1581 Act of Abjuration. The revolt resulted in the establishment of a de facto independent Protestant republic in the north by Treaty of Antwerp (1609), but the Dutch were never able to successfully remove the Spanish foothold in the southern Netherlands. The eight decades of war came at a massive human cost, with an estimated 600,000 to 700,000 victims, of which 350,000 to 400,000 were civilians killed by disease and what would later be considered war crimes.

The coastal provinces of Holland and Zeeland had been important hubs of the European maritime trade network for centuries prior to Spanish rule. Their geographical location provided convenient access to the markets of France, Scotland, Germany, England and the Baltic. The war with Spain led many financiers and traders to emigrate from Antwerp, a major city in Flanders and then one of Europe's most important commercial centres, to Dutch cities, particularly Amsterdam, which became Europe's foremost centre for shipping, banking, and insurance. Efficient access to capital enabled the Dutch in the 1580s to extend their trade routes beyond northern Europe to new markets in the Mediterranean and the Levant. In the 1590s, Dutch ships began to trade with Brazil and the Dutch Gold Coast of Africa, towards the Indian Ocean, and the source of the lucrative spice trade. This brought the Dutch into direct competition with Portugal, which had dominated these trade routes for several decades, and had established colonial outposts on the coasts of Brazil, Africa and the Indian Ocean to facilitate them. The rivalry with Portugal, however, was not entirely economic: from 1580, after the death of the King of Portugal, Sebastian I, and much of the Portuguese nobility in the Battle of Alcácer Quibir, the Portuguese crown had been joined to that of Spain in an "Iberian Union" under the heir of Emperor Charles V, Philip II of Spain. By attacking Portuguese overseas possessions, the Dutch forced Spain to divert financial and military resources away from its attempt to quell Dutch independence. Thus began the several decade-long Dutch–Portuguese War.

In 1594, the Compagnie van Verre ("Company of Far Lands") was founded in Amsterdam, with the aim of sending two fleets to the spice islands of Maluku. The first fleet sailed in 1596 and returned in 1597 with a cargo of pepper, which more than covered the costs of the voyage. The second voyage (1598–1599), returned its investors a 400% profit. The success of these voyages led to the founding of a number of companies competing for the trade. The competition was counterproductive to the companies' interests as it threatened to drive up the price of spices at their source in Indonesia whilst driving them down in Europe.

Rise of Dutch economic hegemony (1602–1652) 

As a result of the problems caused by inter-company rivalry, the Dutch East India Company (VOC) was founded in 1602. The charter awarded to the Company by the States-General granted it sole rights, for an initial period of 21 years, to Dutch trade and navigation east of the Cape of Good Hope and west of the Straits of Magellan. The directors of the company, the "Heeren XVII", were given the legal authority to establish "fortresses and strongholds", to sign treaties, to enlist both an army and a navy, and to wage defensive war. The company itself was founded as a joint stock company, similarly to its English rival that had been founded two years earlier, the English East India Company. In 1621, the Dutch West India Company (WIC) was set up and given a 25-year monopoly to those parts of the world not controlled by its East India counterpart: the Atlantic, the Americas and the west coast of Africa. The Dutch also established a trading post in Ayutthaya, modern day Thailand during the reign of King Naresuan, in 1604.

Iberian-Dutch conflicts

The Spanish-Dutch War was for the Dutch part of their struggle for independence and religious freedom, during the Eighty Years' War. It was largely fought on the European continent, but war was also conducted against Phillip II's overseas territories, including Spanish colonies and the Portuguese metropoles, colonies, trading posts and forts belonging at that time to the King of Spain and Portugal.

The Netherlands became part of the domains of the "Spanish branch" of the Habsburg dynasty when Emperor Charles V divided the holdings of the Habsburg Empire following his abdication in 1555. In 1566, the Dutch Revolt erupted. In 1568, the Dutch Republic embarked on the long, torturous path of the Eighty Years' War (also known as the Dutch War of Independence) and began the invasion and looting of Spanish (and, later, Portuguese) colonies in the Americas and of Asia, including an attempted invasion of the Philippines (then part of the Spanish East Indies).

From 1517, the port of Lisbon in Portugal was the main European market for products from India that was attended by other nations to purchase their needs. But as a result of Portugal's incorporation in the Iberian Union with Spain by Philip II in 1580, all Portuguese territories were thereafter Spanish Habsburg branch territory, and thus all Portuguese markets were closed to the United Provinces. Thus, in 1595, the Dutch decided to set sail on their own to acquire products for themselves, making use of the "secret" knowledge of the Portuguese trade routes, which Cornelis de Houtman had managed to acquire in Lisbon.

Pursuing their quest for alternative routes to Asia for trade, the Dutch were disrupting the Spanish-Portuguese trade, and they eventually ranged as far afield as the Philippines. The Dutch sought to dominate the commercial sea trade in Southeast Asia, going so far in pursuit of this goal as to engage in what other nations and powers considered to be little more than piratical activities.

The joining of the two crowns deprived Portugal of a separate foreign policy, with King Phillip II's enemies becoming Portugal's enemies as well. War with the Dutch led to attacks on most of Portugal's far-flung trading network in and around Asia, including Ceylon (modern Sri Lanka), and Goa, as well as attacks upon her commercial interests in Japan, Africa (especially Mina), and South America. Even though the Portuguese had never been able to capture the entire island of Ceylon, they had been able to keep the coastal regions under their control for a considerable time before the coming of the Dutch in war. Portugal's South American colony, Brazil, was partially conquered by both France and the United Provinces.

In the 17th century, the "Grand Design" of the West India Company involved attempting to corner the international trade in sugar by attacking Portuguese colonies in Brazil and Africa, seizing both the sugarcane plantations and the slave ports needed to resupply their labour. Although weakened by the Iberian Union with Spain, whose attention was focused elsewhere, the Portuguese were able to fight off the initial assault before the Battle of Matanzas Bay provided the WIC with the funds needed for a successful operation. Johan Maurits was appointed governor of "New Holland" and landed at Recife in January 1637. In a series of successful expeditions, he gradually extended the Dutch possessions from Sergipe on the south to Maranhão in the north. The WIC also succeeded in conquering Gorée, Elmina Castle, Saint Thomas, and Luanda on the west coast of Africa. Both regions were also used as bases for Dutch privateers plundering Portuguese and Spanish trade routes. The dissolution of the Iberian Union in 1640 and Maurits's recall in 1643 led to increased resistance from the Portuguese colonists who still made up a majority of the Brazilian settlers. The Dutch were finally overcome during the 1650s but managed to receive 4 million reis (63 metric tons of gold) in exchange for extinguishing their claims over Brazil in the 1661 Treaty of the Hague.

Asia 

The war between Phillip II's possessions and other countries led to a deterioration of the Portuguese Empire, as with the loss of Ormuz to England, but the Dutch Empire was the main beneficiary.

The VOC began immediately to prise away the string of coastal fortresses that, at the time, comprised the Portuguese Empire. The settlements were isolated, difficult to reinforce if attacked, and prone to being picked off one by one, but nevertheless, the Dutch only enjoyed mixed success in its attempts to do so. Amboina was captured from the Portuguese in 1605, but an attack on Malacca the following year narrowly failed in its objective to provide a more strategically located base in the East Indies with favourable monsoon winds. The Dutch found what they were looking for in Jakarta, conquered by Jan Pieterszoon Coen in 1619, later renamed Batavia after the putative Dutch ancestors the Batavians, and which would become the capital of the Dutch East Indies. Meanwhile, the Dutch continued to drive out the Portuguese from their bases in Asia. Malacca finally succumbed in 1641 (after a second attempt to capture it), Colombo in 1656, Ceylon in 1658, Nagapattinam in 1662, and Cranganore and Cochin in 1662.

Goa, the capital of the Portuguese Empire in the East, was unsuccessfully attacked by the Dutch in 1603 and 1610. Whilst the Dutch were unable in four attempts to capture Macau, from where Portugal monopolized the lucrative China-Japan trade, the Tokugawa shogunate's increasing suspicion of the intentions of the Catholic Portuguese led to their expulsion in 1639. Under the subsequent sakoku policy, from 1639 till 1854 (215 years) the Dutch were the only European power allowed to operate in Japan, confined in 1639 to Hirado and then from 1641 at Dejima. In the mid-17th century, the Dutch also explored the western Australian coasts, naming many places.

The Dutch colonised Mauritius in 1638, several decades after three ships out of the Dutch Second Fleet sent to the Spice Islands were blown off course in a storm and landed there in 1598. They named it in honour of Prince Maurice of Nassau, the Stadtholder of the Netherlands. The Dutch found the climate hostile and abandoned the island after several further decades.

The Dutch established a colony at Tayouan (present-day Anping), in the south of Taiwan, an island then largely dominated by Portuguese traders and known as Formosa; and, in 1642 the Dutch took northern Formosa from the Spanish by force.

The Dutch tried to use military force to make Ming China open up to Dutch trade but the Chinese defeated the Dutch in a war over the Penghu islands from 1623 to 1624, forcing the VOC to abandon Penghu for Taiwan. Then Chinese defeated the Dutch again at the Battle of Liaoluo Bay in 1633.

In 1646, the Dutch tried to capture the Spanish colony in the Philippines. Although they had a large force at their disposal, they were defeated at the Battles of La Naval de Manila when they attempted to take Manila. After this defeat, they abandoned their efforts to capture Manila and the Philippines.

Between 1602 and 1796, the VOC sent almost a million Europeans to work in the Asia trade. The majority died of disease or made their way back to Europe, but some of them made the Indies their new home. Interaction between the Dutch and native population mainly took place in Sri Lanka and the modern Indonesian Islands. Through the centuries there developed a relatively large Dutch-speaking population of mixed Dutch and Indonesian descent, known as Indos or Dutch-Indonesians.

Americas 

In the Atlantic, the West India Company concentrated on wresting from Portugal its grip on the sugar and slave trade, and on opportunistic attacks on the Spanish treasure fleets on their homeward bound voyage. Bahia on the north east coast of Brazil was captured in 1624 but only held for a year before it was recaptured by a joint Spanish-Portuguese expedition. In 1628, Piet Heyn captured the entire Spanish treasure fleet, and made off with a vast fortune in precious metals and goods that enabled the Company two years later to pay its shareholders a cash dividend of 70%, though the Company was to have relatively few other successes against the Spanish. In 1630, the Dutch occupied the Portuguese sugar-settlement of Pernambuco and over the next few years pushed inland, annexing the sugar plantations that surrounded it. In order to supply the plantations with the manpower they required, a successful expedition was launched from Brazil to capture the Portuguese slaving post of Elmina in 1637, and successfully captured the Portuguese settlements in Angola in 1641. In 1642, the Dutch captured the Portuguese possession of Axim in Africa. By 1650, the West India Company was firmly in control of both the sugar and slave trades, and had occupied the Caribbean islands of Sint Maarten, Curaçao, Aruba, and Bonaire in order to guarantee access to the islands' salt-pans.

Unlike in Asia, Dutch successes against the Portuguese in Brazil and Africa were short-lived. Years of settlement had left large Portuguese communities under the rule of the Dutch, who were by nature traders rather than colonisers. In 1645, the Portuguese community at Pernambuco rebelled against their Dutch masters, and by 1654, the Dutch had been ousted from Brazil. In the intervening years, a Portuguese expedition had been sent from Brazil to recapture Luanda in Angola, expelling the Dutch by 1648.

On the north-east coast of North America, the West India Company took over a settlement that had been established by the Company of New Netherland (1614–1618) at Fort Orange at Albany on the Hudson River, relocated from Fort Nassau which had been founded in 1614. The Dutch had been sending ships annually to the Hudson River to trade fur since Henry Hudson's voyage of 1609. To protect its precarious position at Albany from the nearby English and French, the Company founded the fortified town of New Amsterdam in 1625, at the mouth of the Hudson, encouraging settlement of the surrounding areas of Long Island and New Jersey. The fur trade ultimately proved impossible for the Company to monopolize due to the massive illegal private trade in furs, and the settlement of New Netherland was unprofitable. In 1655, the nearby colony of New Sweden on the Delaware River was forcibly absorbed into New Netherland after ships and soldiers were sent to capture it by the Dutch governor, Pieter Stuyvesant.

Since its inception, the Dutch East India Company had been in competition with its counterpart, the English East India Company, founded two years earlier but with a capital base eight times smaller, for the same goods and markets in the East. In 1619, the rivalry resulted in the Amboyna massacre, when several English Company men were executed by agents of the Dutch. The event remained a source of English resentment for several decades, and indeed was used as a cause célèbre as late as the Second Anglo-Dutch War in the 1660s; nevertheless, in the late 1620s the English Company shifted its focus from Indonesia to India.

In 1643, the Dutch West India Company established a settlement in the ruins of the Spanish settlement of Valdivia, in southern Chile. The purpose of the expedition was to gain a foothold on the west coast of the Americas, an area that was almost entirely under the control of Spain (the Pacific Ocean, at least most of it to the east of the Philippines, being at the time almost a "Spanish lake"), and to extract gold from nearby mines. Uncooperative indigenous peoples, who had forced the Spanish to leave Valdivia in 1604 contributed to get the expedition to leave after some months of occupation. This occupation triggered the return of the Spanish to Valdivia and the building of one of the largest defensive complexes of colonial America.

Southern Africa

By the middle of the 17th century, the Dutch East India Company had overtaken Portugal as the dominant player in the spice and silk trade, and in 1652 founded a colony at the Cape of Good Hope on the southern African coast, as a victualing station for its ships on the route between Europe and Asia. Dutch immigration in the Cape rapidly swelled as prospective colonists were offered generous grants of land and tax exempt status in exchange for producing the food needed to resupply passing ships. The Cape authorities also imported a number of Europeans of other nationalities, namely Germans and French Huguenots, as well as thousands of slaves from the East Indies, to bolster the local Dutch workforce. Nevertheless, there was a degree of cultural assimilation between the various ethnic groups due to intermarriage and the universal adoption of the Dutch language, and cleavages were likelier to occur along social and racial lines.

The Dutch colony at the Cape of Good Hope expanded beyond the initial settlement and its borders were formally consolidated as the composite Dutch Cape Colony in 1778. At the time, the Dutch had subdued the indigenous Khoisan and San peoples in the Cape and seized their traditional territories. Dutch military expeditions further east were halted when they encountered the westward expansion of the Xhosa people. Hoping to avoid being drawn into a protracted dispute, the Dutch government and the Xhosa chieftains agreed to formally demarcate their respective areas of control and refrain from trespassing on each other's borders. However, the Dutch proved unable to control their own settlers, who disregarded the agreement and crossed into Xhosa territory, sparking one of Southern Africa's longest colonial conflicts: the Xhosa Wars.

Rivalry with Great Britain and France (1652–1795) 
In 1651, the English parliament passed the first of the Navigation Acts which excluded Dutch shipping from the lucrative trade between England and its Caribbean colonies, and led directly to the outbreak of hostilities between the two countries the following year, the first of three Anglo-Dutch Wars that would last on and off for two decades and slowly erode Dutch naval power to England's benefit.

In 1661, amidst the Qing conquest of China, Ming general Koxinga led a fleet to invade Formosa. The Dutch defense, led by governor Frederick Coyett, held out for nine months. However, after Koxinga defeated Dutch reinforcements from Java, Coyett surrendered Formosa. The Dutch would never rule Formosa again.

The Second Anglo-Dutch War was precipitated in 1664, when English forces moved to capture New Netherland. Under the Treaty of Breda (1667), New Netherland was ceded to England in exchange for the English settlements in Suriname, which had been conquered by Dutch forces earlier that year. Though the Dutch would again take New Netherland in 1673, during the Third Anglo-Dutch War, it was returned to England the following year, thereby ending Dutch rule in continental North America, but leaving behind a large Dutch community under English rule that persisted with its language, church and customs until the mid-18th century. In South America, the Dutch seized Cayenne from the French in 1658 and drove off a French attempt to retake it a year later. However, it was returned to France in 1664, since the colony proved to be unprofitable. It was recaptured by the Dutch in 1676, but was returned again a year later, this time permanently. The Glorious Revolution of 1688 saw the Dutch William of Orange ascend to the throne, and win the English, Scottish, and Irish crowns, ending eighty years of rivalry between the Netherlands and England, while the rivalry with France remained strong.

During the American Revolutionary War, Britain declared war on the Netherlands, the Fourth Anglo-Dutch War, in which Britain seized the Dutch colony of Ceylon. Under the Peace of Paris (1783), Ceylon was returned to the Netherlands and Negapatnam ceded to Britain.

Napoleonic era (1795–1815) 

In 1795, the French Revolutionary Army invaded the Dutch Republic and turned the nation into a satellite of France, named the Batavian Republic. Britain, which was at war with France, soon moved to occupy Dutch colonies in Asia, South Africa, and the Caribbean.

Under the terms of the Treaty of Amiens signed by Britain and France in 1802, the Cape Colony and the islands of the Dutch West Indies that the British had seized were returned to the Republic. Ceylon was not returned to the Dutch and was made a British Crown Colony. After the outbreak of hostilities between Britain and France again in 1803, the British retook the Cape Colony. The British also invaded and captured the island of Java in 1811.

In 1806, Napoleon dissolved the Batavian Republic and established a monarchy with his brother, Louis Bonaparte, on the throne as King of the Netherlands. Louis was removed from power by Napoleon in 1810, and the country was ruled directly from France until its liberation in 1813. The following year, the independent Netherlands signed the Anglo-Dutch Treaty of 1814 with Britain. All the colonies Britain had seized were returned to the Netherlands, with the exception of the Dutch Cape Colony, Dutch Ceylon, and part of Dutch Guyana.

Post-Napoleonic era (1815–1945) 

After Napoleon's defeat in 1815, Europe's borders were redrawn at the Congress of Vienna. For the first time since the declaration of independence from Spain in 1581, the Dutch were reunited with the Southern Netherlands in a constitutional monarchy, the United Kingdom of the Netherlands. The union lasted just 15 years. In 1830, a revolution in the southern half of the country led to the de facto independence of the new state of Belgium.

The bankrupt Dutch East India Company was liquidated on 1 January 1800, and its territorial possessions were nationalized as the Dutch East Indies.
Anglo-Dutch rivalry in Southeast Asia continued to fester over the port of Singapore, which had been ceded to the British East India Company in 1819 by the sultan of Johore. The Dutch claimed that a treaty signed with the sultan's predecessor the year earlier had granted them control of the region. However, the impossibility of removing the British from Singapore, which was becoming an increasingly important centre of trade, became apparent to the Dutch, and the disagreement was resolved with the Anglo-Dutch Treaty of 1824. Under its terms, the Netherlands ceded Malacca and their bases in India to the British, and recognized the British claim to Singapore. In return, the British handed over Bencoolen and agreed not to sign treaties with rulers in the "islands south of the Straits of Singapore". Thus the archipelago was divided into two spheres of influence: a British one, on the Malay Peninsula, and a Dutch one in the East Indies.

For most of the Dutch East Indies history, and that of the VOC before it, Dutch control over their territories was often tenuous, but was expanded over the course of the 19th century. Only in the early 20th century did Dutch dominance extend to what was to become the boundaries of modern-day Indonesia. Although highly populated and agriculturally productive Java was under Dutch domination for most of the 350 years of the combined VOC and Dutch East Indies era, many areas remained independent for much of this time including Aceh, Lombok, Bali, and Borneo.

In 1871, all of the Dutch possessions on the Dutch Gold Coast were sold to Britain. The Dutch West India Company was abolished in 1791, and its colonies in Suriname and the Caribbean brought under the direct rule of the state. The economies of the Dutch colonies in the Caribbean had been based on the smuggling of goods and slaves into Spanish America, but with the end of the slave trade in 1814 and the independence of the new nations of South and Central America from Spain, profitability rapidly declined. Dutch traders moved en masse from the islands to the United States or Latin America, leaving behind small populations with little income and which required subsidies from the Dutch government. The Antilles were combined under one administration with Suriname from 1828 to 1845.

Slavery was not abolished in the Dutch Caribbean colonies until 1863, long after those of Britain and France, though by this time only 6,500 slaves remained. In Suriname, slave holders demanded compensation from the Dutch government for freeing slaves, whilst in Sint Maarten, abolition of slavery in the French half in 1848 led slaves in the Dutch half to take their own freedom. In Suriname, after the abolition of slavery, Chinese workers were encouraged to immigrate as indentured labourers, as were Javanese, between 1890 and 1939.

Decolonization (1942–1975)

Indonesia

In January 1942, Japan invaded the Netherlands East Indies. The Dutch surrendered two months later in Java, with Indonesians initially welcoming the Japanese as liberators. The subsequent Japanese occupation of Indonesia during the remainder of World War II saw the fundamental dismantling of the Dutch colonial state's economic, political and social structures, replacing it with a Japanese regime. In the decades before the war, the Dutch had been overwhelmingly successful in suppressing the small nationalist movement in Indonesia such that the Japanese occupation proved fundamental for Indonesian independence. However, the Indonesian Communist Party founded by Dutch socialist Henk Sneevliet in 1914, popular also with Dutch workers and sailors at the time, was in strategic alliance with Sarekat Islam (q.v.) as early as 1917 until the Proclamation of Indonesian Independence and was particularly important in the fight against Japanese occupation of the Dutch East Indies in the Second World War. The Japanese encouraged and backed Indonesian nationalism in which new indigenous institutions were created and nationalist leaders such as Sukarno were promoted. The internment of all Dutch citizens meant that Indonesians filled many leadership and administrative positions, although the top positions were still held by the Japanese.

Two days after the Japanese surrender in August 1945, Sukarno and fellow nationalist leader Hatta unilaterally declared Indonesian independence. A four and a half-year struggle followed as the Dutch tried to re-establish their colony. Dutch forces eventually re-occupied most of the colonial territory and a guerrilla struggle ensued. The majority of Indonesians, and – ultimately – international opinion, favored independence, and in December 1949, the Netherlands formally recognized Indonesian sovereignty. Under the terms of the 1949 agreement, Western New Guinea remained under the auspices of the Dutch as Netherlands New Guinea, and its dispute will be resolved by a year. The new Indonesian government under President Sukarno pressured for the territory to come under Indonesian control as Indonesian nationalists initially intended. Following United States pressure, the Netherlands transferred it to Indonesia under the 1962 New York Agreement.

Suriname and the Netherlands Antilles
In 1954, under the "Charter for the Kingdom of the Netherlands", the Netherlands, Suriname and the Netherlands Antilles (at the time including Aruba) became a composite state, known as the "Tripartite Kingdom of the Netherlands". The former colonies were granted autonomy, save for certain matters including defense, foreign affairs and citizenship, which were the responsibility of the Realm. In 1969, unrest in Curaçao led to Dutch marines being sent to quell rioting. In 1973, negotiations started in Suriname for independence, and full independence was granted in 1975, with 60,000 emigrants taking the opportunity of moving to the Netherlands. In 1986, Aruba was allowed to secede from the Netherlands Antilles federation, and was pressured by the Netherlands to move to independence within ten years. However, in 1994, it was agreed that its status as a Realm in its own right could continue.

On 10 October 2010, the Netherlands Antilles were dissolved. Effective on that date, Curaçao and Sint Maarten acceded to the same country status within the Kingdom that Aruba already enjoyed. The islands of Bonaire, Sint Eustatius and Saba were granted a status similar to Dutch municipalities, and are now sometimes referred to as the Caribbean Netherlands.

Legacy 

Generally, the Dutch do not celebrate their imperial past, and anti-colonial sentiments have prevailed since Jacob Haafner's 1807 treatise. Subsequently, colonial history is not featured prominently in Dutch schoolbooks. This perspective on their imperial past has only recently started to shift.

Dutch diaspora

In some Dutch colonies there are major ethnic groups of Dutch ancestry descending from emigrated Dutch settlers. In South Africa the Boers and Cape Dutch are collectively known as the Afrikaners. The Burgher people of Sri Lanka and the Indo people of Indonesia as well as the Creoles of Suriname are mixed race people of Dutch descent.

In the U.S., there have been three American presidents of Dutch descent: Martin Van Buren, the first president who was not of British descent, and whose first language was Dutch, the 26th president Theodore Roosevelt, and Franklin D. Roosevelt, the 32nd president, elected to four terms in office (1933 to 1945) and the only U.S. president to have served more than two terms.

Dutch language

Dutch in Southeast Asia
Despite the Dutch presence in Indonesia for almost 350 years, the Dutch language has no official status and the small minority that can speak the language fluently are either educated members of the oldest generation, or employed in the legal profession, as some legal codes are still only available in Dutch. The Indonesian language inherited many words from Dutch, both in words for everyday life, and as well in scientific or technological terminology. One scholar argues that 20% of Indonesian words can be traced back to Dutch words.

Dutch in South Asia
The century and half of Dutch rule in Ceylon (modern-day Sri Lanka) and southern India left few to no traces of the Dutch language.

Dutch in the Americas
In Suriname, Dutch is the official language. 82% of the population can speak Dutch fluently In Aruba, Bonaire, and Curaçao, Dutch is the official language but a first language for only 7–8% of the population; though most of the population is fluent in Dutch, which is generally the language of education.

The population of the three northern Antilles, Sint Maarten, Saba, and Sint Eustatius, is predominantly English-speaking.

In New Jersey, an extinct dialect of Dutch, Jersey Dutch, was spoken by descendants of 17th-century Dutch settlers in Bergen and Passaic counties, was noted to still be spoken as late as 1921.  U.S. President Martin Van Buren, raised in a Dutch-speaking enclave in New York, had Dutch as his native language.

Dutch in Africa
The greatest linguistic legacy of the Netherlands was in its colony in South Africa, which attracted large numbers of Dutch farmer (in Dutch, Boer) settlers, who spoke a simplified form of Dutch called Afrikaans, which is largely mutually intelligible with Dutch. After the colony passed into British hands, the settlers spread into the hinterland, taking their language with them. , there were 10 million people for whom Afrikaans is either a primary and secondary language, compared with over 22 million speakers of Dutch.

Other creole languages with Dutch linguistic roots are Papiamento still spoken in Aruba, Bonaire, Curaçao, and Sint Eustatius; Saramaccan and Sranan Tongo still spoken in Suriname; Berbice an extinct language in Guyana; Pecok spoken but in danger of extinction in Indonesia and the Netherlands; Albany Dutch spoken but in danger of extinction in the U.S.

Extinct Dutch-based creole languages include: Skepi (Guyana); Negerhollands (aka "Negro Dutch"), Jersey Dutch and Mohawk Dutch (U.S.), and Javindo (Java).

Placenames 

Some towns of New York and areas of New York City, once part of the colony of New Netherland have names of Dutch origin, such as Brooklyn (after Breukelen), Flushing (after Vlissingen), the Bowery (after Bouwerij, construction site), Harlem (after Haarlem), Coney Island (from Conyne Eylandt, modern Dutch spelling Konijneneiland: Rabbit island) and Staten Island (meaning "Island of the States"). The last Director-General of the colony of New Netherland, Pieter Stuyvesant, has bequeathed his name to a street, a neighborhood and a few schools in New York City, and the town of Stuyvesant. Many of the towns and cities along the Hudson in upstate New York have placenames with Dutch origins (for example Yonkers, Hoboken, Haverstraw, Claverack, Staatsburg, Catskill, Kinderhook, Coeymans, Rensselaer, Watervliet). Nassau County, one of the four that make up Long Island, is also of Dutch origin. The Schuylkill river that flows into the Delaware at Philadelphia is also a Dutch name meaning hidden or skulking river.

Many towns and cities in Suriname share names with cities in the Netherlands, such as Alkmaar and Groningen. The capital of Curaçao is named Willemstad and the capitals of both Saint Eustatius and Aruba are named Oranjestad. The first is named after the Dutch Prince Willem II van Oranje-Nassau (William of Orange-Nassau) and the two others after the first part of the current Dutch royal dynasty.

Many of South Africa's major cities have Dutch names i.e. Johannesburg, Kaapstad, Vereeniging, Bloemfontein and Vanderbijlpark.

The country name New Zealand originated with Dutch cartographers, who called the islands Nova Zeelandia, after the Dutch province of Zeeland. British explorer James Cook subsequently anglicized the name to New Zealand.

The Australian island state Tasmania is named after Dutch explorer Abel Tasman, who made the first reported European sighting of the island on 24 November 1642. He first named the island Anthony van Diemen's Land after his sponsor Anthony van Diemen, the Governor of the Dutch East Indies. The name was later shortened to Van Diemen's Land by the British. It was officially renamed in honor of its first European discoverer on 1 January 1856. Arnhem Land is named after the Dutch ship named Arnhem. The captain of the Arnhem (Willem van Coolsteerdt) also named the large island, east of Arnhem Groote Eylandt, in modern Dutch spelling Groot Eiland: Large Island. There are many more Dutch geographical names in Australia.

Architecture

In the Surinamese capital of Paramaribo, the Dutch Fort Zeelandia still stands today. The city itself also have retained most of its old street layout and architecture, which is part of the world's UNESCO heritage. In the centre of Malacca, Malaysia, the Stadthuys Building and Christ Church still stand as a reminder of Dutch occupation. There are still archaeological remains of Fort Goede Hoop (modern Hartford, Connecticut) and Fort Orange (modern Albany, New York).

Dutch architecture is easy to see in Aruba, Curaçao, Bonaire, and Saint Eustatius. The Dutch style buildings are especially visible in Willemstad, with its steeply pitched gables, large windows and soaring finials.

Dutch architecture can also be found in Sri Lanka, especially in Galle where the Dutch fortification and canal have been retained intact, even to an extent the former tropical Villas of the VOC officials. Some of the most prominent example of these architecture is the former governor's mansion in Galle, currently known as Amangalla Hotel and the Old Dutch Reformed Church. In the capital Colombo, many of the Dutch and Portuguese architecture around The Fort have been demolished during the British period, few of the remaining include Old Colombo Dutch Hospital and Wolvendaal Church.

During the period of Dutch colonisation in South Africa, a distinctive type of architecture, known as Cape Dutch architecture, was developed. These style of architecture can be found in historical towns such as Stellenbosch, Swellendam, Tulbagh, and Graaff-Reinet. In the former Dutch capital of Cape Town, nearly nothing from the VOC era have survived except the Castle of Good Hope.

Although the Dutch already started erecting buildings shortly after they arrived on the shores of Batavia, most Dutch-built constructions still standing today in Indonesia stem from the 19th and 20th centuries. Forts from the colonial era, used for defense purposes, still line a number of major coastal cities across the archipelago. The largest number of surviving Dutch buildings can be found on Java and Sumatra, particularly in cities such as Jakarta, Bandung, Semarang, Yogyakarta, Surabaya, Cirebon, Pasuruan, Bukittinggi, Sawahlunto, Medan, Padang, and Malang. There are also significant examples of 17–19th century Dutch architecture around Banda Neira, Nusa Laut, and Saparua, the former main spices islands, which due to limited economic development have retained many of its colonial elements. Another prominent example of Dutch colonial architecture is Fort Rotterdam in Makassar. The earlier Dutch construction mostly replicate the architecture style in the Homeland (such as Toko Merah). However these buildings were unsuitable to tropical climate and expensive to maintain. And as a result the Dutch officials begun to adapt to the tropical condition by applying native elements such as wide-open veranda, ventilation and indigenous high pitch roofing into their villas. "In the beginning (of the Dutch presence), Dutch construction on Java was based on colonial architecture which was modified according to the tropical and local cultural conditions," Indonesian art and design professor Pamudji Suptandar wrote. This was dubbed arsitektur Indis (Indies architecture), which combines the existing traditional Hindu-Javanese style with European forms.

Many public buildings still standing and in use in Jakarta, such as the presidential palace, the finance ministry and the performing arts theater, were built in the 19th century in the classicist style. At the turn of the 20th century and partially due to the Dutch Ethical Policy, the number of Dutch people migrating to the colony grew with economic expansion. The increasing number of middle class population led to the development of Garden Suburbs in major city across the Indies, many of the houses were built in various style ranging from the Indies style, Neo-Renaissance to modern Art Deco. Some examples of these residential district include Menteng in Jakarta, Darmo in Surabaya, Polonia in Medan, Kotabaru in Yogyakarta, New Candi in Semarang and as well as most of North Bandung. Indonesia also became an experimental ground for Dutch Art Deco architectural movement such as Nieuwe Zakelijkheid, De Stijl, Nieuw Indische and Amsterdam School. Several famous architect such as Wolff Schoemaker and Henri Maclaine Pont also made an attempt to modernize indigenous architecture, resulting several unique design such as Pohsarang Church and Bandung Institute of Technology. The largest stock of these Art Deco building can be found in the city of Bandung, which "architecturally" can considered the most European city in Indonesia.

Since Indonesia's independence, few governments have shown interest in the conservation of historical buildings. Many architecturally grand buildings have been torn down in the past decades to erect shopping centres or office buildings e.g. Hotel des Indes (Batavia), Harmony Society, Batavia. Presently, however, more Indonesians have become aware of the value of preserving their old buildings.

"A decade ago, most people thought I was crazy when they learned of my efforts to save the old part of Jakarta. A few years later, the negative voices started to disappear, and now many people are starting to think with me: how are we going to save our city. In the past using the negative sentiment towards the colonial era was often used as an excuse to disregard protests against the demolition of historical buildings. An increasing number of people now see the old colonial buildings as part of their city's overall heritage rather than focusing on its colonial aspect.", leading Indonesian architect and conservationist Budi Lim said.

Infrastructure

Beyond Indonesia's art deco architecture also much of the country's rail and road infrastructure as well as its major cities were built during the colonial period. Many of Indonesia's main cities were mere rural townships before colonial industrialization and urban development. Examples on Java include the capital Jakarta and Bandung, outside Java examples include Ambon and Menado city. Most main railroads and rail stations on Java as well as the main road, called Daendels Great Post Road (Dutch: Grote Postweg) after the Governor General commissioning the work, connecting west to east Java were also built during the Dutch East Indies era.

Between 1800 and 1950 Dutch engineers created an infrastructure including  of roads,  of railways, many large bridges, modern irrigation systems covering 1.4 million hectares (5,400 sq mi) of rice fields, several international harbors, and 140 public drinking water systems. These Dutch constructed public works became the material base of the colonial and postcolonial Indonesian state.

Agriculture

Crops such like coffee, tea, cocoa, tobacco and rubber were all introduced by the Dutch. The Dutch were the first to start the spread of the coffee plant in Central and South America, and by the early 19th century Java was the third largest producer in the world. In 1778 the Dutch brought cacao from the Philippines to Indonesia and commenced mass production. Currently Indonesia is the world's second largest producer of natural rubber, a crop that was introduced by the Dutch in the early 20th century. Tobacco was introduced from the Americas and in 1863 the first plantation was established by the Dutch. Today Indonesia is not only the oldest industrial producer of tobacco, but also the second largest consumer of tobacco.

Scientific discoveries
Java Man was discovered by Eugène Dubois in Indonesia in 1891. The Komodo dragon was firstly described by Peter Ouwens in Indonesia in 1912 after an airplane crash in 1911 and rumors about living dinosaurs on Komodo Island in 1910.

Sport

Suriname
Many Suriname-born football players and Dutch-born football players of Surinamese descent, like Gerald Vanenburg, Ruud Gullit, Frank Rijkaard, Edgar Davids, Clarence Seedorf, Patrick Kluivert, Aron Winter, Georginio Wijnaldum, Virgil van Dijk and Jimmy Floyd Hasselbaink have turned out to play for the Dutch national team. In 1999, Humphrey Mijnals, who played for both Suriname and the Netherlands, was elected Surinamese footballer of the century. Another famous player is André Kamperveen, who captained Suriname in the 1940s and was the first Surinamese to play professionally in the Netherlands.

Suriname discourages dual citizenship and Surinamese-Dutch players who have picked up a Netherlands passport – which, crucially, offers legal work status in almost any European league – are barred from selection to the national team. In 2014, inspired by the success of teams with dual nationals, especially Algeria, SVB president John Krishnadath submitted a proposal to the national assembly to allow dual citizenship for athletes with the then-goal of reaching the 2018 FIFA World Cup finals. In order to support this project, a team with professional players of Surinamese origin was assembled and played an exhibition match on 26 December 2014 at the Andre Kamperveen Stadion. The project is managed by Nordin Wooter and David Endt, who have set up a presentation and sent invitations to 100 players of Surinamese origin, receiving 85 positive answers. Dean Gorré was named to coach this special selection. FIFA supported the project and granted insurance for the players and clubs despite the match being unofficial. In November 2019, it was announced that a so-called sports passport would allow Dutch professional footballers from the Surinamese diaspora to represent Suriname.

Suriname also has a national korfball team, with korfball being a Dutch sport. Vinkensport is also practised in Suriname, as are popular among the Dutch sports of volleyball and troefcall.

South Africa
Ajax Cape Town were a professional football team named and owned by Ajax Amsterdam, replicating their crest and colours.

The Dutch sport of korfball is administered by the South African Korfball Federation, who manage the South Africa national korfball team. The 2019 IKF World Korfball Championship was held in August 2019 in Durban, South Africa.

Indonesia
The Indonesian football league started around 1930 in the Dutch colonial era. The Indonesian men's team was the first Asian team to qualify for the FIFA World Cup; in 1938 FIFA World Cup they played as the Dutch East Indies. Association football is now the most popular sport in Indonesia, in terms of annual attendance, participation and revenue and it is played on all levels, from children to middle-aged men.

The Indonesian Tennis Association was also founded during Dutch rule in 1935, and has a long history of fielding its national Fed Cup team and Davis Cup team, although the first participation's in the 60s were not till after independence.

As in the Netherlands, volleyball remains a popular sport, with the Indonesian Volleyball Federation organising both the Men's Pro Liga and women's Pro Liga and administrates the men's and women's national teams.

The Dutch sport of korfball is also practised, and there is a national korfball team.

Territorial evolution

See also 

 Dutch colonization of the Americas
 Dutch Language Union
 List of Dutch East India Company trading posts
 Ministry of the Colonies (Netherlands)

Notes

Citations

References

Further reading 
 
 
 
 
 
 
 
 Klooster, Wim. The Dutch Moment: War, Trade, and Settlement in the Seventeenth-Century Atlantic World (2016)
 Klooster, Wim, and Gert Oostindie. Realm between Empires: The Second Dutch Atlantic, 1680-1815 (Cornell UP,  2018) 348 pp. online review
 Koekkoek, René, Anne-Isabelle Richard, and Arthur Weststeijn. "Visions of Dutch Empire: Towards a Long-Term Global Perspective." Bijdragen en Mededelingen Betreffende de Geschiedenis der Nederlanden 132.2 (2017): 79–96. online
 Legêne, Susan. "The European character of the intellectual history of Dutch empire." BMGN-Low Countries Historical Review 132.2 (2017). online
 Noorlander, Danny L. Heaven’s Wrath: The Protestant Reformation and the Dutch West India Company in the Atlantic World (Cornell UP, 2019).
 Noorlander, D. L. "The Dutch Atlantic world, 1585–1815: Recent themes and developments in the field." History Compass (2020): e12625.
 Panikkar, K. M. (1953). Asia and Western dominance, 1498–1945, by K.M. Panikkar. London: G. Allen and Unwin.
 Poddar, Prem, and Lars Jensen, eds., A historical companion to postcolonial literatures: Continental Europe and Its Empires (Edinburgh UP, 2008), "Netherlands and its colonies" pp 314–401. excerpt  also entire text online

External links 
  De VOCsite
 Dutch and Portuguese Colonial History
  VOC Kenniscentrum
 
 The Atlas of Mutual Heritage database, showing the Dutch empire 1600–1800.

 
History of European colonialism
Former empires in Europe
Overseas empires
Dutch Republic
States and territories established in the 1540s
States and territories disestablished in 1975
Historical transcontinental empires